Alexander Otaola is a Cuban-American actor, social media influencer, and political activist. Otaola is the host of the web show Hola Ota-Ola!, an informative and satirical program that covers entertainment, news and politics. His show debuted on Cubanos por el Mundo: a cross platform media initiative, website, and YouTube channel that covers politics, news, and celebrity culture in Cuba and the Cuban exile community. Alexander Otaola is a vocal opponent of the communist regime in Cuba denouncing its human rights violations and crimes in all his shows.

Biography 
Alexander Otaola Casal was born in Camagüey, Cuba on April 28, 1979. For secondary school, he studied at a special athletic school in Cuba known as ESPA where he trained in water polo, horse riding, chess and ended up in gymnastics and musical aerobics.  In an interview with CiberCuba, Otaola said he was born in a society with a culture often favoring a strong sense of masculinity ("machismo") and experienced bullying and homophobia in Cuba.

On December 3, 2003, Alexander emigrated to the United States from Cuba on a Visa.  He settled in Miami where he worked as a waiter, cashier at Walmart, baker, and a manager in a housekeeping business. In 2008, he returned to television and worked in telenovelas and comedy shows. He portrayed the character Carlos Recto in the MEGATV show Esta Noche Tu Night hosted by Alexis Valdés, and also participated in a Venevision talk show called ¿Quién Tiene la Razón?. Later in 2015, he was suspended by the television network Mega TV for using an obscene word during an interview. In 2017, he started webcasting his show Hola Ota-Ola! which has a large audience in Cuba and the United States.

Political activism 
Otaola has organized boycotts on Cuban artists such as Haila Mompié, Jacob Forever, El Micha, and Gente de Zona which has resulted in their shows being canceled in Miami. As a result of his social media activism, Haila Mompié was declared persona non grata in the city of Miami by the mayor Francis X. Suarez. In 2019, Otaola criticized the daughter of Raul Castro, Mariela Castro, for canceling the annual gay pride parade in Cuba and failing to protect gay rights activists from violence by Cuban security forces.
 On social media, Otaola has attempted to uncover Ciberclarias, which he claims are false profiles that spread propaganda for the Cuban government. On February 29, 2020, Otaola organized a Caravan in Calle Ocho, Miami, for the liberation of Cuba, the release of political prisoners in Cuba, and to support the Trump administration's policies on Cuba.  According to the Miami Herald, the caravan consisted in as many as 2,000 cars. Following the car caravan to condemn the Cuban regieme, Otaola congregated a second caravan to support Law and Order and peace.

During the George Floyd protests, Otaola joined the BlackTuesday campaign on Instagram in support of black victims of police violence and added the hashtag #AllLivesMatter. Otaola said on his show: "If we are going to fight racism, it is not by segregating or separating into races that we are going to achieve it". He also said the murder of George Floyd was not justified and the police officer kneeling on his neck should be punished. He also expressed his belief that mainstream media and the left were trying to promote vandalism and portray Floyd like a hero.

José Daniel Ferrer 
On his show, Otaola has demanded the release of political prisoner and human rights activist José Daniel Ferrer and founder of the human rights group the Patriotic Union of Cuba (UNPACU). In 2019, he called for a proof of life for José Daniel Ferrer. Otaola vigorously defended the human rights activist from allegations by a Cuban television station that Ferrer bashed his head against a desk in prison, he claimed the video was manipulated. Upon Ferrer's release to house arrest in 2020, Ferrer was interviewed on Hola Ota-Ola! and expressed gratitude toward the program for raising awareness to secure his release.

Controversy

Descemer Bueno 
In 2019, Otoala sued Descemer Bueno for defamation and it has resulted in an ongoing court battle.

Roberto F. Hidalgo Puentes 
In May 2018, Otaola filed a police report which alleges that Roberto F. Hidalgo Puentes, half of the Cuban duo Yomil y Dany, assaulted him inside a store in Miami. In a statement to Martí Noticias, Otaola said this is not the first time he has been threatened by Hidalgo, and he alleges Hidalgo threatened to kill him during an event in Punta Cana. Hidalgo returned to Cuba after the incident. In 2018 according to Daniel Benítez of América TeVé, a Miami Dade judge signed an arrest warrant for Mr. Hidalgo.

5 de Septiembre Accusations 
On January 10, 2020, Julio Martínez Molina published an article in the Cienfuegos newspaper, 5 de Septiembre, which alleged that Alexander Otaola is accused of sexual abuse of a minor in Cuba.    Otaola denies the allegation and has consulted with his legal team to request the retraction of that statement by the newspaper.

Chocolate MC 
During an interview Chocolate MC walked out of the Hola Ota-Ola show. Since their initial meeting, Otaola and Chocolate MC have reconciled. Chocolate MC attended the Caravan in 2020.

Red List 
On his show he has an ongoing list of Cuban artists, celebrities, and business people who continue to work in Cuba while also possessing a green card in order to reside or work in the United States.

Personal life

Relationships 
According to an interview with Ileana Marce, Alexander Otaola is currently single.

Criticism

Boycotts 
Critics have voiced concern about Otaola's advocacy for boycotting certain Cuban artists. Several Cuban-Americans who were interviewed by the Associated Press criticized the ban as an act of discrimination and censorship. However, the mayor of Miami Francis Xavier Suarez supported the ban stating: “It’s not about intolerance or censorship, it’s about respect and recognizing the mortifying history of communism, especially in Cuba”.

References

External links 

 

20th-century Cuban male actors
21st-century Cuban male actors
Cuban male comedians
Cuban comedians
Cuban activists
Cuban male television actors
Cuban male film actors
Living people
1979 births